Tatyana Aleksandrovna Navka (born 13 April 1975) is a Russian former competitive ice dancer and wife of Dmitry Peskov. With her dance partner Roman Kostomarov, she is the 2006 Olympic champion, a two-time World champion (2004–05), a three-time Grand Prix Final champion (2003–05), and a three-time European champion (2004–06). 

Earlier in her career, she competed for the Soviet Union and Belarus.

Early life
Tatiana Navka was born on 13 April 1975 in Dnipropetrovsk, Ukrainian SSR, Soviet Union. She is the daughter of Raisa, an economist, and Aleksandr, an engineer, and has a younger sister, Natalia. In 1988, she moved to Moscow Oblast, Russian SFSR.

Career

Early years in skating 
Tatiana Navka became interested in skating at the age of five after seeing it on television. Tamara Yarchevskaya and Alexander Rozhin coached her during her early years as a single skater. In 1987, following a 14 cm growth spurt that hampered her jumps, her parents were advised that she should try ice dancing.

Partnership with Gezalian 
In 1988, at the invitation of Russian coach Natalia Dubova, Navka relocated to Moscow and began training at the Moskvich sports club, partnered with Samvel Gezalian. The two represented the Soviet Union early in their career, winning gold at the 1991 Skate America and 1991 Nations Cup. Following the country's dissolution, Navka/Gezalian chose to skate for Belarus. They placed ninth in their debut at the European and World Championships, in 1993.

In the 1993–94 season, Navka/Gezalian won silver at the 1993 Skate Canada International and placed fourth at the 1993 NHK Trophy. They competed at the 1994 Winter Olympics in Lillehammer, placing 11th, before achieving their career-best Worlds result, fifth at the 1994 World Championships in Chiba, Japan. In 1994–95, Navka/Gezalian won silver at the 1994 NHK Trophy and went on to achieve their best European result, fourth, at the 1995 European Championships in Dortmund. Their partnership came to an end following the 1995 World Championships, where they placed seventh.

Partnership with Morozov 
Navka teamed up with Nikolai Morozov in 1996, continuing to represent Belarus. At their first practice at the 1997 World Championships, Morozov sustained a torn meniscus in his knee but they finished 14th at the event and he then underwent surgery. They earned an Olympic berth by winning gold at the 1997 Karl Schäfer Memorial. 90 seconds into their free dance at the 1998 Winter Olympics, nearly three-quarters of the floodlights turned off but Navka/Morozov did not interrupt their performance. They finished 16th at the Olympics in Nagano, Japan, and 10th at the 1998 World Championships in Minneapolis. They were coached by Alexander Zhulin and Bob Young at the International Skating Center in Simsbury, Connecticut. Following 1998 Worlds, Navka ended the partnership to compete with another skater.

Partnership with Kostomarov 
Navka then teamed up with Roman Kostomarov and began competing for Russia during the 1998–99 season. They were coached by Natalia Linichuk. They won the bronze medal at the Russian Championships and were sent to the World Championships in their first season together, placing 12th. Linichuk then dissolved the team and paired Kostomarov with Anna Semenovich. Navka became pregnant with her daughter and took a year off from competition.

In mid-2000, Kostomarov called Navka and asked to skate with her again. They were coached by Alexander Zhulin in Hackensack and Montclair, New Jersey. Navka/Kostomarov won the World title in 2004 and again in 2005. They also won three European titles from 2004–2006. They then won gold at the 2006 Winter Olympics in Turin, Italy. At the age of 30 years and 313 days, she became one of the oldest female figure skating Olympic champions.

Navka/Kostomarov retired from competition after the Olympics but continue to skate in shows together.

Later career
Navka has partnered with Russian celebrities to compete in Channel One Russia ice shows: Stars On Ice, which she won with actor Marat Basharov, and Ice Age, in which she was runner-up with actor Ville Haapasalo. In the 2008–09 season of Ice Age, she was runner-up for the second time, partnered with actor Vadim Kolganov.

In September 2008, Navka, together with professional dancer Alexander Litvinenko, took part in the Eurovision Dance Contest 2008. In October 2011, she became a 2014 Winter Olympics (Sochi) ambassador.

Personal life
Navka became a citizen of Belarus by 1994 and of Russia no later than 2002. She formerly resided in New Jersey.

In 2000, Navka married Russian ice dancer Alexander Zhulin. Their daughter, Sasha, was born in May 2000 in the United States. The couple filed for divorce in the summer of 2009 and were officially divorced in July 2010.

Navka and Russian diplomat Dmitry Peskov, the press spokesman for Vladimir Putin, have a daughter, Nadezhda (Nadia), born in August 2014 in Russia. They married in a civil ceremony at a registry office in June 2015 before a larger ceremony on 1 August 2015.

In May 2020, Navka was hospitalized for COVID-19.

Controversies
From 2014 to 2015, Navka was the beneficiary of Carina Global Assets Ltd., an offshore company in the British Virgin Islands. In February 2019, questions were raised over Navka and her husband's wealth following reports about their ownership of multiple properties in the Moscow region. An investigation by The Guardian suggested that Navka may have underreported income, claimed married status for several years after her divorce from Zhulin, and falsely told the IRS that she had sold a house in the United States.

In 2016, Navka caused controversy when she and her dancing partner, Andrey Burkovsky, appeared in the Russian version of Dancing on Ice dressed as Holocaust concentration camp prisoners. Navka and Burkovsky said that the dance was inspired by the 1997 film Life Is Beautiful and was not intended to cause offense.

In 2021, Navka made and published sexist comments about Spanish rhythmic gymnast Cristofer Benítez. Through her social networks, she said that rhythmic gymnastics was a "feminine sport", and that she is glad that in her country men are not allowed to participate in rhythmic gymnastics "and hopefully never will". After her remarks were called homophobic, she made another post to say that her statement was not about the LGBT community and reaffirmed her sexist comments, also expressing support for the Russian gay propaganda law.

Sanctions
On 11 March 2022, Navka was included in the list of specially designated nationals sanctioned by the United States Department of the Treasury as part of the international sanctions during the Russo-Ukrainian War due to her being the family of Dmitry Peskov, who had been blacklisted earlier in March because of his key role in the Russian invasion of Ukraine. On 3 June, she was sanctioned by the European Union. On 21 November, she was sanctioned by New Zealand.

Programs

With Kostomarov

With Morozov

With Gezalian

Competitive highlights
GP: Champions Series / Grand Prix

With Kostomarov for Russia

With Morozov for Belarus

With Gezalian for Belarus and the Soviet Union

References

External links

Care to Ice Dance? – Navka / Kostomarov

1975 births
Living people
Russian female ice dancers
Belarusian female ice dancers
Russian people of Ukrainian descent
Belarusian emigrants to Russia
Ukrainian emigrants to Russia
Olympic figure skaters of Belarus
Olympic figure skaters of Russia
Figure skaters at the 1994 Winter Olympics
Figure skaters at the 1998 Winter Olympics
Figure skaters at the 2002 Winter Olympics
Figure skaters at the 2006 Winter Olympics
Olympic gold medalists for Russia
Sportspeople from Dnipro
Olympic medalists in figure skating
World Figure Skating Championships medalists
European Figure Skating Championships medalists
Medalists at the 2006 Winter Olympics
Goodwill Games medalists in figure skating
Season-end world number one figure skaters
Competitors at the 2001 Goodwill Games
Russian individuals subject to the U.S. Department of the Treasury sanctions
Russian individuals subject to European Union sanctions
Peskov family